Malvern Festival may refer to:

 The Malvern Festival (1929-1939)
 Malvern Fringe Festival